Newcastle Crossing railway station co-served the hamlet of Stapeley, Cheshire East, England, from 1911 to 1918 on the Crewe and Shrewsbury Railway.

History 
The station was opened on 2 January 1911 by the London and North Western Railway. It closed on 1 April 1918. The Railway Clearing House handbook showed it as a halt in their 1921 list of closures.

References 

Disused railway stations in Cheshire
Former London and North Western Railway stations
Railway stations in Great Britain opened in 1911
Railway stations in Great Britain closed in 1918
1911 establishments in England
1918 disestablishments in England